Louis Pasteur Middle School may refer to:
middle school 
A middle school in Orangevale under the San Juan Unified School District
A middle school in the San Dian Unified School District
A defunct junior high school in Los Angeles Unified School District, whose campus now homes Los Angeles Center for Enriched Studies

See also 
 List of things named after Louis Pasteur